Christopher Kas and Dick Norman were the defending champion, but Norman chose to compete.
Kas chose to compete with Paul Hanley, but they lost in the first round to Niels Desein and Tim Pütz.

Ken and Neal Skupski won the title, defeating Benjamin Becker and Tobias Kamke in the final, 6–3, 6–7(5–7), [10–7].

Seeds

Draw

Draw

References
 Main Draw

ATP Roller Open - Doubles
2013 Doubles
2013 in Luxembourgian tennis